Babatunde (variant forms: Babatunji, Babajide, Babawande, Babaside, Babatide, Bababode,  Babs) is a male given name. In the Yoruba language, it means 'father returns', or ' a father has returned'. This generally refers to a male ancestor such as a deceased father, grandfather, or great-grandfather.

People named Babatunde

As a given name
Babatunde Adebimpe, American actor and musician known professionally as Tunde Adebimpe
Babatunde Aiyegbusi, Polish-Nigerian wrestler and former American football player
Babatunde Aléshé, British actor, writer and comedian
Samuel Babatunde Bajah, Nigerian educator
Babatunde Elegbede, military governor of Cross State, Nigeria, 1978–1979
Babatunde Fashola, Minister of Power, Works and Housing, 2015–present; governor of Lagos State, 2007–2015
Bomani Babatunde Jones, American sports journalist
Babatunde Jose (1925–2008), Nigerian journalist
Babatunde Lawal, Nigerian art historian in the United States
Babatunde Lea, Afro-Cuban and worldbeat percussionist
Babajide Ogunbiyi, American soccer player
Babawande Olabisi, Nigerian-American baseball player known as Wande Olabisi
Babatunde Olatunji, Nigerian drummer
Babatunji Olowofoyeku, Nigerian lawyer, politician and educator
Babatunde Ogunnaike, Nigerian-American chemical engineer
Babatunde Oshinowo, NFL player
Babatunde Osotimehin, Nigerian Minister of Health, 2007–2010
Akinwande Oluwole Babatunde Soyinka, Nigerian Nobel laureate
Babatunde Wusu, Nigerian-Finnish football striker
Babatunde Yusuf, Nigerian football player

As a surname
Babajide Collins Babatunde, Nigerian-born, Russian-based footballer
Badmus Babatunde, Nigerian footballer
Ibrahim Babatunde, Nigerian-born, Italian-based footballer
Michael Babatunde, Nigerian footballer
Obba Babatundé, American actor of stage and screen

See also
Yetunde
Tunde

References

African masculine given names
Yoruba given names
Yoruba-language surnames
Reincarnation